Narrab or Narab may refer to:
 Nar Ab, East Azerbaijan Province
 Narrab, Golestan
 Narab, Jiroft, Kerman Province
 Narrab, Rabor, Kerman Province
 Narab, Sirjan, Kerman Province